"Animals Are People Too" is the last ever episode of the British comedy television series The Goodies. This episode was made by LWT for ITV and was written by The Goodies, with songs and music by Bill Oddie. The last ever episode marked the last regular appearances of Tim Brooke-Taylor, Graeme Garden and Bill Oddie.

The last ever episode is also known as "Pets".

Plot
Tim has bought a dog from Graeme, but the dog does not obey Tim's orders. In the end, Tim returns the dog to Graeme, who then sells him a 'new model dog' (Bill).

Cultural references
 Barbara Woodhouse
 ITN News at Ten

Notes

Last regular appearances of Tim Brooke-Taylor, Graeme Garden and Bill Oddie.

Tim Brooke-Taylor died on 12 April 2020 from complications of COVID-19.

Since the death of Tim Brooke-Taylor in April 2020, Garden and Oddie are the two surviving members of The Goodies.

DVD and VHS releases

This episode has been released on DVD.

References

 "The Complete Goodies" — Robert Ross, B T Batsford, London, 2000
 "The Goodies Rule OK" — Robert Ross, Carlton Books Ltd, Sydney, 2006
 "From Fringe to Flying Circus — 'Celebrating a Unique Generation of Comedy 1960-1980'" — Roger Wilmut, Eyre Methuen Ltd, 1980
 "The Goodies Episode Summaries" — Brett Allender
 "The Goodies — Fact File" — Matthew K. Sharp

External links
 

The Goodies (series 9) episodes
1982 British television episodes